Elizabeth Graham may refer to:
Elizabeth Jennings Graham (1830–1901), black woman who insisted on being admitted to a streetcar in 1854
Elizabeth Graham (academic), educator in Mesoamerican archaeology